This page details the process of qualifying for the 2002 African Cup of Nations.

Qualified teams
The 16 qualified teams are:

Qualifying rounds

Preliminary round
The quarter finalists of 2000 Africa Cup of Nations received a bye to the group stage. These teams are: Algeria, Egypt, Ghana, Nigeria, Senegal, South Africa, Tunisia.

|}

Burkina Faso win 3–0 on aggregate.

Guinea win 4–2 on aggregate.

Gabon win 5–2 on aggregate.

Angola win 5–1 on aggregate.

Namibia win 8–4 on aggregate.

Ivory Coast win 7–0 on aggregate.

Liberia win 3–1 on aggregate.

Togo win 4–2 on penalties after 2–2 after extra time.

DR Congo won 3–1 on aggregate.

Sudan won 6–3 on aggregate.

Congo won 6–3 on aggregate.

Burundi won 4–1 on aggregate.

Madagascar won 2–1 on aggregate.

Libya won 8–7 on penalty shootout after 4–4 on aggregate.

Zambia on 2–1 on aggregate.

Zimbabwe on 6–0 on aggregate.

Mauritius won 4–2 on aggregate.

Uganda won 5–2 on aggregate.

Lesotho won 3–2 on penalty shootout after 1–1 after extra time.

Kenya won 5–3 on aggregate.

Guinea-Bissau withdrew; Morocco advanced.

Group round
Qualifying took place between 2 September 2000 and 17 June 2001.

Group 1

Group 2

Group 3

Group 4

Group 5
Guinea were excluded on 19 March 2001, after the Guinean sports minister had failed to meet a third FIFA deadline to reinstall the Guinean FF functionaries.

Group 6

Group 7

External links
Details at RSSSF

Africa Cup of Nations qualification
Qual
Qual
qualification